The Duluth Pack company is a manufacturer and supplier of Duluth pack style packs.  They also produce and sell a range of other products, especially other bags and accessories built in the style of their packs. The company grew out of the shoe repair business started by Camille Poirier in 1870.  He patented the #3 Duluth pack in 1882 and later sold the canoe pack business to an outdoor supply store in downtown Duluth, Minnesota, where it is still located. The company is led and co-owned by Tom Sega.

History
The Duluth pack was invented by a French-Canadian named Camille Poirier, who went west to Duluth in 1870.  Arriving with his "little stock of leather and tools", he began a small shoe store and quickly found success in what was then a booming frontier town. Out of his small shoe shop on the waterfront, Poirier began building a new style of canoe pack with a tumpline, sternum strap, and umbrella holder. He patented the design in 1882. The original #3 Duluth Packs have changed little since then, and came to be extensively used on wilderness canoe camping trips, giving prominence to both the name of the pack and the company.  In 1911, Poirier sold off the canoe pack business to Duluth Tent and Awning on West Superior Street in downtown Duluth.  In the 1920s, as America began its love affair with the automobile and auto camping became all the rage, Duluth Pack built "auto packs" that would clamp to the running boards of the car to hold extra gear. In some ways these were forerunners of RVs.  The company has since grown globally and started joint ventures with Barney's in New York, Urban Outfitters, and other prominent companies.

Duluth Pack signing pledge to American workers
In July 2020, the company faced backlash online and protests in person for allowing Ivanka Trump to visit their Canal Park location. Concerns expressed included apparent support for the Trump administration, which was advocating issuing a controversial mining permit for the Twin Metals copper-nickel mining project, set to be located near the Boundary Waters Canoe Area Wilderness. The Obama administration had rescinded the leases for the project, however the Trump administration returned them. A reporter from the Duluth News Tribune who attended the media event wrote, "When asked by the News Tribune if they support Twin Metals and how they reconcile signing a pledge with an administration that is advancing this project, [co-owner Mark Oestreich] declined to comment."

Trademark claim
The company has been headquartered at its present location for over 100 years and later changed the name it operates under to Duluth Pack.  Although their trademark identifies themselves as "Duluth Pack, Duluth, Minn", it makes no claim to "Duluth Pack" alone as a trademark (or as "Duluth, Minn"), as per the US Patent and Trademark Office.

Locations and operations

The single Duluth Pack store is located at 365 Canal Park Drive in Canal Park, Duluth. Duluth Pack also sells its products online and through a wide network of dealers around the world.

Products

Duluth pack
A Duluth pack is a traditional portage pack used in canoe travel, particularly in the Boundary Waters region of northern Minnesota and the Quetico Provincial Park of Ontario.  A specialized type of backpack, Duluth packs are made of heavy canvas and leather, and are nearly square in order to fit easily in the bottom of a canoe. The typical Duluth pack consists of a single large envelope that is closed by leather straps and roller buckles rather than a zipper. Larger sizes, such as #4, have a "set-out" and so are box-shaped rather than envelope-shaped.  The pack is carried by two shoulder straps, and sometimes a tumpline worn over the top of the head.  They are made in several sizes, traditionally referred to by numbers.  While Duluth Pack is the name of a specifically branded product, the term "Duluth pack" has become commonly used to refer to any pack of the same or similar style used in canoe travel.

Their key attributes make them well adapted to wilderness camping where travel is largely by water (where the packs and gear do not need to be carried) punctuated by portages where the packs and gear need to be carried over land:

They are generally larger than other packs, accommodating a quantity of gear. Canoe camping typically involves carrying more and heavier gear than, for example, backpacking.
They must be built strong, carrying heavy loads even when exposure to the elements can weaken pack materials, especially by water saturation.
Their shape accommodates large volumes while remaining compact, and their design has few protuberances.  This allows better fitting into canoes, less snagging during loading and unloading, and packing lower in canoes to lower the center of gravity to enhance stability.
They are not tall above the wearer's shoulders (as backpacking packs typically are), allowing the wearer to also carry a canoe.
Some have a tumpline, which assists weight distribution with heavy loads.

Conversely, they lack many features and attributes of long-distance backpacking backpacks, and so are generally not used for such purposes.

Other products 
The woodsmen and women of the 1940s and 1950s needed a pack they could take into the trees, but that would not snag on branches like the canoe pack.  The Cruiser Pack was created to fulfill this requirement.  These packs were narrower, but still as tough as a canoe pack, and they could travel more easily between the trees.  The 1960s and 1970s saw the entry of the age of air travel and the need for durable luggage.  While Duluth Pack had been building luggage for Gokey's and Orvis since the 1950s, a new line of sportsman's duffels was introduced and became popular.  The most recent redesigns to the venerable pack have included padded laptop sleeves.

The rugged canvas and leather style of Duluth packs has become fashionable, and the company manufactures and markets a range of other products, such as purses and computer cases made in the same style.

Duluth Pack also manufactures American Heritage products such as purses, briefcases, backpacks, iPad cases, luggage, gun cases, and a variety of accessory items. In addition to the traditional canvas and leather, there are new product lines using Faribault Woolen Mills wool, Woolrich wool, and American Bison leather grown in North Dakota and tanned in St. Paul, Minnesota.  In addition to products produced in their 15 standard colors, they have a line of camouflage bags and accessories using Mossy Oak New Break Up canvas.

References

External links
Official website Duluth Pack Co.

Companies based in Minnesota
Luggage manufacturers
Duluth, Minnesota